Lachnoanaerobaculum is a bacterial genus from the family of Lachnospiraceae which typically occurs in the human mouth and intestine.

References

Further reading 
 
 
 

Lachnospiraceae
Bacteria genera